Pavel Korda (born 17 May 1971) is a former Czech darts player and currently sports commentator for TV Nova and active promoter of darts in Czech Republic.

Career 

During his darts career he participated in many tournaments on national and European scene. His biggest success is the title of the National Champion in teams with DC Bizoni.

For more than 10 years he was vice-chairman of Czech Darts Organization and he contributed to the rise of an international tournament, Czech Open.

As a manager of Czech Youth National Darts Team he was at the historically first medals for Czech darts on international level, during WDF Europe Cup Youth 2008.

Sports commentator and darts 

From 2015 he is a sports commentator for Czech TV Nova. He provides a commentary for all major darts tournaments broadcast on channels Nova Sport and Nova Sport2 (PDC World Darts Championship, Premier League, World Matchplay etc.) 

From 2015 he is also responsible for the national team of the Czech Republic competing in PDC World Cup of Darts, in which the Czech Republic regularly participates.

He is also known as an active promoter of darts, he managed to push through the historically first tournament of PDC European Tour that took place in Eastern Europe. The tournament was held in PVA Expo Prague from 28 to 30 June 2019 under the name Czech Darts Open 2019. There were 48 players in the tournament, including the biggest stars of darts, Michael van Gerwen, Peter Wright, Gerwyn Price, Adrian Lewis, James Wade and more. The first winner of the tournament was Jamie Hughes.

He is also a promoter of darts exhibition tournaments in Czech Republic with the presence of the most famous players. In February 2018 he organized the very first darts exhibition in Eastern Europe, Rebel Prague Darts Masters 2018, which took place in Prague in Královka arena. Among invited players, there was the world number one and at that time the current world champion, Michael van Gerwen, also his countryman and five times world champion, Raymond van Barneveld, the finalist of World Grand Prix and the winner of European Championship, Simon Whitlock and the legendary Englishman, one of the most popular darts player, Wayne Mardle. Russ Bray, the famous darts caller, was invited as the referee. Four Czech players also took part in the exhibition, Karel Sedláček, František Humpula, Michal Kočík and David Písek.

After the big success of the first exhibition, he organized another one in November of the same year, Rebel Prague Darts Masters Winter Classic 2018. Michael van Gerwen and Wayne Mardle were invited again, along with Peter Wright (the winner of UK Open 2017 and world champion 2020) and the finalist of UK Open 2007, Vincent van der Voort. George Noble was invited as the referee and John McDonald as Master of Ceremony. Again, four Czech players took part, this time Karel Sedláček, Pavel Jirkal, Michal Ondo and Roman Benecký.

Another exhibition followed in 2019, this time with legends of darts, Prague Darts Masters 2019. This event took place 1 November in Prague, again in Královka arena. The biggest star was sixteen-time world champion, Phil Taylor. Other participants were Paul Lim, representing Singapore, the first player hitting a 9-darter during televised World Darts Championship; then 12 major tournaments winner and three times BDO world champion, Martin Adams. The fourth one was the former PDC world number one and the winner of 2 major tournament (World Matchplay and World Grand Prix), Colin Lloyd. From Czech players, there was Miloslav Navrátil, the first Czech darts player who qualified to PDC World Darts Championship and also Karel Sedláček, Martin Hoffmann, Daniel Záruba and Michal Ondo.

At the beginning of 2020 he made an interview for Czech broadcast, DVTV, and spoke about darts in the Czech Republic and overall.

During the world-wide pandemy of coronavirus he came with an idea to organize the first edition of Tipsport Premier League 2020. The tournament was broadcast on TV Nova Sport2 and was at that time one of the only live sport events in Czech Republic and one of the few in Europe. The league was inspired by PDC Premier League and 10 Czech players took part in it. All players played from their home and the whole event had also a charitable purpose, for every 180 scored, a specific amount of money was donated to charity.

References

1971 births
Czech darts players
Living people
People from Kutná Hora
Sportspeople from the Central Bohemian Region